Spalona  is a village in the administrative district of Gmina Bystrzyca Kłodzka within Kłodzko County, Lower Silesian Voivodeship in southwestern Poland. Prior to 1945, it was a part of Germany.

References

Villages in Kłodzko County
Witam kupie opla